Hoofnagle is a surname. Notable people with the surname include:

 Chris Hoofnagle, American law professor
 Jay Houston Hoofnagle (born 1943), American expert in hepatotoxicity, hepatitis, cirrhosis and other diseases of the liver
 William Hoofnagle (1921–2012), American economist and politician